Brooklyn Candida Rodriguez (born August 30, 2002), known professionally as Bktherula, is an American rapper, singer and songwriter from Atlanta, Georgia. She is recognized for her aesthetic and devoted fanbase.

Early life 
Rodriguez recorded her first song at the age of 9 on a tape recorder. She started uploading songs to SoundCloud at the age of 13. Her father was a rapper in a group called Planet X.

Career 
She began getting traction on the streaming platform SoundCloud in 2018 with the release of her singles "Faygo" and "Left Right". In 2020, her song "Tweakin’ Together" went viral on social media platform TikTok. In January 2020, she released her single "On Me". In July 2020, she released her single "Summer". In October 2020, Rodriguez released her album Love Santana. In 2021, her single "Watch Me" was placed in video game NBA 2K22. In October 2021, she released a music video for her single "Placement" with American rapper Matt Ox. In March 2022, she released two singles titled "Keep da K" and "Coupe". In April 2022, she appeared in the music video for the Rico Nasty song "Vaderz" which she featured on. In August 2022, she performed at Rolling Loud in Miami.

References

External links 
 

2002 births
African-American women rappers
21st-century American women musicians
Living people
People from Atlanta
Rappers from Atlanta
Southern hip hop musicians
Warner Music Group artists